I-Fly is a Russian charter airline based in Moscow operating mainly out of Vnukovo International Airport. It flies all services on behalf of Russian tour operator TEZ Tour.

Destinations
I-Fly destinations:

Fleet

The I-Fly fleet consists of the following aircraft, as of July 2022:

The airline fleet previously included the following aircraft:
 1 Boeing 757-200 (as of November 2015)

References

External links

Official website 

Airlines of Russia
Airlines established in 2009
Airlines banned in the European Union
Charter airlines
Companies based in Moscow
2009 establishments in Russia